This is a comprehensive list of awards and nominations received by Anastacia, an American pop singer. She has been active since 1990. She first gained prominence on BET's Comic View, singing Oleta Adams Get Here in 1992 age 24. She has won 74% of her nominations. Besides World Music Awards, Anastacia only got nominations for European ceremonies.
{| class="wikitable sortable plainrowheaders" 
|-
! scope="col" | Award
! scope="col" | Year
! scope="col" | Nominee(s)
! scope="col" | Category
! scope="col" | Result
! scope="col" class="unsortable"| 
|-
!scope="row"|Amadeus Austrian Music Awards
| 2001
| rowspan=6|Herself
| Best International Artist
| 
| 
|-
!scope="row"|Bambi Awards
| 2002
| Best International Newcomer
| 
| 
|-
! scope="row" rowspan=3|Brit Awards
| rowspan=2|2002
| International Breakthrough Act
| 
| rowspan=2|
|-
| rowspan=2|International Female Solo Artist
| 
|-
| 2005
| 
|
|-
!scope="row"|Danish Music Awards
| 2001
| Best International Newcomer
| 
| 
|-
! scope="row"|Diva Entertainment Awards
| 2005
| Anastacia
| Most Successful Music-CD
| 
| 
|-
! scope="row" rowspan="4" | ECHO Awards
| rowspan=2|2001
| rowspan=10|Herself
| Best International Newcomer
| 
| rowspan=2|
|-
| rowspan=3|Best International Female
| 
|-
| 2003
| 
| 
|-
| 2005
| 
| 
|-
!scope="row" rowspan=2|Edison Music Awards
| 2001
| Best International Newcomer
| 
|
|-
| 2002
| Best International Female
| 
| 
|-
!scope="row"|GQ Men of the Year Awards
| 2013
| Humanitarian Award
| 
| 
|-
!scope="row" rowspan=3|Goldene Europa Awards
| rowspan=2|2000
| Artist of the Year 
| 
| rowspan=2| 
|-
| Best Newcomer
| 
|-
| 2002
| Best International Pop Artist
| 
| 
|-
!scope="row"|Hungarian Music Awards
| 2009
| Heavy Rotation
| Dance-Pop Album of the Year
| 
| 
|-
! scope="row" rowspan=2|Italian Music Awards
| 2000
| rowspan=8|Herself
| rowspan=2|Best International Female Artist
| 
| 
|-
| 2001
| 
| 
|-
!scope="row"|M6 Awards
| 2000
| International Breakthrough of the Year
| 
| 
|-
! scope="row" rowspan=6|MTV Europe Music Awards
| 2000
| Best New Act
| 
| 
|-
| 2001
| rowspan=3|Best Pop
| 
| 
|-
| 2002
| 
| 
|-
| rowspan=3|2004
|  
| rowspan=3|
|-
| Best Female
| 
|-
| "Left Outside Alone"
| Best Song
| 
|-
!scope="row"|MTV Russia Music Awards
| 2004
| rowspan=3|Herself
| Best International Act
| 
| 
|-
!scope="row"|Maxim Magazine Awards
| 2004
| rowspan=2|Woman of the Year 
| 
| 
|-
! scope="row"|Marie Claire
| 2005
| 
| 
|-
!scope="row"|Muz-TV Music Awards
| 2011
| "Safety" (with Dima Bilan)
| Best Duo
| 
|
|-
!scope="row" rowspan="2" | NRJ Music Awards
| rowspan=2|2001
| rowspan=1|Herself
| International Breakthrough of the Year
| 
| rowspan=2|
|-
| "I'm Outta Love"
| International Song of the Year
| 
|-
! scope="row" rowspan="3" | NRJ Radio Awards
| rowspan=3|2005
| rowspan=2|Herself
| Best International Female
| 
| rowspan=3|
|-
| Best International Pop
| 
|-
| "Left Outside Alone" 
| Best International Song
| 
|-
!scope="row" |Noordzee FM Awards
| 2004
| rowspan=4|Herself
| rowspan=2|Best International Female Artist
| 
| 
|-
! scope="row"|Nordic Music Awards
| 2004
| 
| 
|-
!scope="row"|Radio Regenbogen Award
| 2014
| Humanitarian Award
| 
| 
|-
! scope="row" rowspan="2" | Rockbjörnen
| rowspan=2|2005
| Best International Artist
| 
| rowspan=2|
|-
| Anastacia
| Best International Album
| 
|-
!scope="row"|SWR3 New Pop Festival
| 2017
| rowspan=3|Herself
| Pioneer of Pop
| 
| 
|-
! scope="row" rowspan="3" | Swedish Hit Music Awards
| rowspan=3|2002
| Most Played Foreign Artist
| 
| rowspan=3|
|-
| Artist of the Year 
| 
|-
| "Paid My Dues"
| Song of the Year
| 
|-
!scope="row" rowspan="6" | TMF Awards
| rowspan=2|2001
| Herself
| Most Promising Act
| 
| rowspan=2| 
|-
| "I'm Outta Love"
| Best Single
| 
|-
| 2002
| rowspan=15|Herself
| rowspan=2|Best International Female
| 
| 
|-
| rowspan=2|2004
| 
| rowspan=2|
|-
| Best International Pop
| 
|-
| 2005
| Best International Female
| 
|
|-
!scope="row"|The Children for Peace
| 2015
| rowspan=2|Humanitarian Award
| 
| 
|-
!scope="row"|The Global Gift Gala
| 2016
| 
| 
|-
! scope="row" rowspan=2|VIVA Comet Awards
| 2002
| rowspan=2|Best International Act
| 
|
|-
| 2004
| 
| 
|-
!scope="row" rowspan=2|World Music Awards
| 2000
| World's Best Selling International Artist
| 
| 
|-
| 2001
| World's Best Selling New Female Pop Artist
| 
| 
|-
!scope="row"| Women's World Award
| 2009
| World Artist Award
| 
| 
|-
!scope="row" rowspan=12|Žebřík Music Awards
| rowspan=2|2000
| Best International Surprise
| 
| rowspan=2|
|-
| rowspan=2|Best International Female
| 
|-
| rowspan=3|2004
| 
| rowspan=10|
|-
| Best International Personality
| 
|-
| rowspan=2|Anastacia
| rowspan=2|Best International Album
| 
|-
| rowspan=6|2005
| 
|-
| rowspan=2|"Left Outside Alone"
| Best International Song
| 
|-
| Best International Video
| 
|-
| rowspan=4|Herself
| Best International Female
| 
|-
| Best International Surprise
| 
|-
| Best International Personality
| 
|-
| 2006
| Best International Female
|

References

External links
 Anastacia.com — Official Anastacia website
 Anastacia on Facebook
 Anastacia on YouTube

Awards
Anastacia